The Murray is a residential area in the new town of East Kilbride, in South Lanarkshire, Scotland; it lies immediately to the south-west of the town centre (access for pedestrians is mainly via underpasses beneath the A726 Queensway), and adjacent to the Westwood, Greenhills and Whitehills neighbourhoods to the west, south-west and south-east respectively.  

The Murray was the first new town development in the area and as such contains the oldest council housing in the town. However, much of this is currently undergoing renovation to improve its condition. Much of the original housing was paid for by Rolls-Royce, as it was intended as accommodation for the workers attracted to the town by the firm's factory. Among the first generation of children to live there was the actor John Hannah. Like the other original neighbourhoods in East Kilbride, it contains a mix of flats in cuboid-shaped buildings and more traditional tenements individual houses in terraces and semi-detached pairs and three tower blocks on the northern periperhy close to the town centre, with basic recreational facilities and a 'village square' of local shops and amenities.

Most of the streets in the area are named for prominent Scots, such as:
- Livingstone Drive (David Livingstone, Christian medical missionary 1813–1873) 
- Owen Avenue (Robert Dale Owen, Scottish-born U.S. social reformer and anti-slavery campaigner 1801–1877) 
- Bell Green (Alexander Graham Bell, 1847–1922)
- Telford Road (Thomas Telford, engineer and noted bridge builder 1757–1834)
- Liddell Grove (Eric Henry Liddell, record-breaking athlete who won Gold and bronze medals in the 1924 Paris Olympic Games 1902–1945) 
- Dale Avenue (David Dale, Businessman and Merchant famous for establishing the New Lanark Mills 1739–1806)
- Slessor Drive (Mary Slessor, Missionary and advocate of woman's rights 1848 1915)
- Simpson Drive (James Young Simpson, doctor and important figure in early anesthesia  1811–1870)

Many people dispute whether to use the definite article in the name; however, it is labelled as 'The Murray' on most maps.

References

Areas of East Kilbride